The Aldeyjarfoss waterfall is situated in the Highlands of Iceland at the northern part of the Sprengisandur Highland Road. The river Skjálfandafljót drops here from a height of 20m. The basalt belongs to a lava field called Frambruni  or Suðurárhraun , hraun being the Icelandic word for lava.

See also

Waterfalls of Iceland
Volcanism of Iceland
List of waterfalls
Geography of Iceland

Waterfalls of Iceland
Columnar basalts in Iceland